Greenergy International Ltd is a British distributor of petrol and diesel for motor vehicles and has over a quarter of the UK market. It blends fuels at terminals on the Thames estuary in the south and on Teesside in the north. It sells more than 20 million litres of petrol and diesel a day. As of 2015 it is currently ranked at 474 in the Fortune 500 list of largest companies by revenue.

History
Greenergy acquired the growing nationwide dealer network  Inver Energy Ltd (which is headquartered in Cork, Ireland) for an undisclosed amount in early 2017. The deal included its co-owned refinery in Foynes (through partnership with East Cork Oil and Atlantic Fuel Supply company), the largest refinery in Ireland at 82,000 m3. It acquired a refinery from Texaco in Cardiff from 2006 which was expanded in 2010 in UK which it owns 100% of which Greenergy also acquired. Inver Energy started as local oil and fuel distributor, had begun its expansion with into Marine Fuels acquiring that business from Maxol and since 2012 is developing from the South and West gradually building its national network of forecourt retailers both company owned and business people's branded supplier stations in the midlands and next North and East.

In 2016, Inver Energy recorded a €5.7 million pre-tax profit last year on turnover of €485.9 million, employing 25 people, providing around 10% of Ireland's marine fuel needs.

Operations
Greenergy sells fuel to petrol stations and supermarkets for retail sale, and to transport companies in the UK and now as Inver in Ireland.

The company produces and sells biofuel. It has a 250,000 tonne/300 million litre per year plant at Immingham on the east coast of England where biodiesel is made from rapeseed oil.

References

Oil and gas companies of the United Kingdom
Automotive fuel retailers
Tesco